Calgary-Northern Hills is a provincial electoral district in Calgary, Alberta, Canada. The district was created in the 2010 boundary redistribution and is mandated to return a single member to the Legislative Assembly of Alberta using the first past the post voting system.

History
The electoral district was created in the 2010 Alberta boundary re-distribution. It was created from Calgary-Mackay which was split to make this district while the rest was merged with Calgary-Nose Hill to make Calgary-Mackay-Nose Hill.

Boundary history

Electoral history

The predecessor district Calgary-Mackay returned Progressive Conservative candidates. The current incumbent is Jamie Kleinsteuber who was first elected in 2015 in the riding of Calgary-MacKay.

Legislature results

2012 general election

2015 general election

Senate nominee results

2012 Senate nominee election district results

Student vote results

2012 election

See also
List of Alberta provincial electoral districts

References

External links
Elections Alberta
The Legislative Assembly of Alberta

Alberta provincial electoral districts
Politics of Calgary